Isolation is the second studio album by Australian hardcore punk band Carpathian. The album peaked at No. 19 on the Australian ARIA Charts. The song "'Permanent" takes lyrics from "Something Must Break" by Joy Division. The title track and "Ceremony" also share their names with Joy Division songs. It reached No. 1 in the ShortFastLoud top 40 countdown of the year on triple J.

Track listing

Charts

Personnel
Martin Kirby – vocals
Josh Manitta – guitar
Lloyd Carroll – guitar 
Ed Redclift – bass guitar, additional vocals on "Deadbeats..."
David Bichard – drums
JD of Shipwreck Ad – additional lyrics and vocals on "Cursed"
Pat Flynn of Have Heart – additional vocals on "Ceremony"
Roman Koester – drum recording
Tony 'Jack The Bear' Mantz – mastering at Deluxe Mastering, Melbourne
DFAXXX – design

References

2008 albums
Carpathian (band) albums
Deathwish Inc. albums